Kwun Yam Shan is the name of two mountains in Hong Kong:
 Kwun Yam Shan (Lantau), on Lantau Island
 Kwun Yam Shan (Yuen Long District), in Yuen Long District

It is the name of a village in Hong Kong:
 Kwun Yam Shan (Sha Tin District), in Sha Tin District